Volkan Pala (born 24 February 1997) is a Turkish professional footballer who plays as a striker for Bayburt Özel İdarespor. He made his professional debut for Galatasaray in a 4-3 loss to Eskişehirspor 2 April 2016.

References

External links
 
 
 

1997 births
People from Bakırköy
Footballers from Istanbul
21st-century Turkish people
Living people
Turkish footballers
Turkey youth international footballers
Association football forwards
Galatasaray S.K. footballers
Çaykur Rizespor footballers
İnegölspor footballers
Vanspor footballers
Sarıyer S.K. footballers
Süper Lig players
TFF Second League players
TFF Third League players